Stiles Curtis (February 15, 1805 – November 11, 1882) was a Warden of the Borough of Norwalk, Connecticut from 1845 to 1853.

He was born in February 1805, in Stratford, Connecticut, the son of William Curtis, and Rebecca Judson.

From 1875 to 1892, he was President of the Bank of Norwalk.

References 

1805 births
1882 deaths
Mayors of Norwalk, Connecticut
People from Stratford, Connecticut
19th-century American politicians